Sahil Panwar (born 16 December 1999) is an Indian professional footballer who plays as a defender for Odisha FC in the Indian Super League.

Career
Born in Dehradun, Uttarakhand, Panwar was discovered by Pune while playing for his college, Maharana Pratap Sports College, during the Subroto Cup in 2014. While with the Pune F.C. Academy, Panwar captained the under-18 side.

Pune City
After the Pune F.C. Academy, He was sold to Indian Super League side Pune City, Panwar joined their academy. After spending time with the academy, Panwar was promoted to the first-team squad in December 2017. He made his professional debut for the club on 13 January 2018 against Chennaiyin. He started and played the whole match as Pune City were defeated 1–0.

Hyderabad
After Pune city FC got dissolved, Sahil Panwar joined newly formed franchise Hyderabad FC.

Odisha
On 14 May 2021, Sahil Panwar joined Odisha FC on a two-year contract, after Odisha agreed to pay an undisclosed transfer fee to Hyderabad FC.

International
Panwar has represented India at the under-20 level and was the captain of the side during the 2017 SAFF U-18 Championship.

Personal life
Sahil married his longtime girlfriend Manasi Gurung in 2022.

Career statistics

References

External links 
 Indian Super League Profile

1999 births
Living people
People from Uttarakhand
Indian footballers
Pune FC players
FC Pune City players
Association football defenders
Footballers from Uttarakhand
Sportspeople from Dehradun
Indian Super League players
India youth international footballers
Hyderabad FC players
Odisha FC players